James Bingham may refer to:
 James Bingham (artist), Belfast-based painter
 James Bingham (Indiana politician), American lawyer and politician
 James M. Bingham, American lawyer and politician in Wisconsin